Rainer Eisfeld (born 4 April 1941, in Berlin) is a German political scientist and professor emeritus at the University of Osnabrück.

Education and career 
Eisfeld received an economics degree from the University of Saarbrücken in 1966 and his PhD in political science from the Goethe University of Frankfurt in 1971. He was assistant professor at Goethe University of Frankfurt, 1972–73, and professor of political science at the University of Osnabrück, 1974-2006 (now emeritus). His international appointments include visiting scholarships at UCLA and the University of Arizona. He taught at UCLA as a visiting professor in 2002.

Eisfeld was Chair of the International Political Science Association (IPSA)'s Research Committee on Socio-Political Pluralism, 2000-2006, and member of the IPSA Executive Committee (as Research Committee Representative), 2006-2012. A former reviewer for the Volkswagen Foundation (1983-1993), Eisfeld serves presently as reviewer for Political Studies, International Political Science Review, European Political Science, and as member of the Polish Political Science Yearbook's Editorial Board. First appointed in 1994, he also continues to serve on the Board of Trustees of Concentration Camp Memorials Buchenwald and Mittelbau-Dora (State of Thuringia, Germany).

Research, awards and honors 
Eisfeld's work has appeared in Politische Vierteljahresschrift, Leviathan, German Politics & Society, European Political Science, Government and Opposition, the International Political Science Review, the International Review of Sociology Journal of Criminal Justice and Popular Culture, Revista Critica de Ciências Sociais(Bibliography), Iberian Studies, Teorija in praksa, the Lithuanian Foreign Policy Review, and "Politicheskaja nauka". His research has focused on theories of pluralism, problems of participatory democracy, the development of the discipline in Germany and East-Central Europe, transition from dictatorship to democracy, and scientists' compliance during the Nazi regime. Displaying a strong historical interest, Eisfeld has also, rather uncommonly for a political scientist, written about the persisting ideology of the American frontier ("progress through violence"), the projection of earthly hopes and fears on another world (the planet Mars), and teenagers' dreams in the 1950s.

Eisfeld won a Faculty Dissertation Award from Frankfurt University in 1971 and a Volkswagen Foundation Research Grant (Akademie-Stipendium) in 1989. His work Mondsüchtig on Wernher von Braun's involvement in the infamous Nazi slave labor program was selected by the journal Bild der Wissenschaft as one of the 'Year's Outstanding Books on Science' in 1997.

Books and edited volumes (selection) 
 Pluralismus zwischen Liberalismus und Sozialismus. Stuttgart, Berlin, Cologne, Mainz: Kohlhammer 1972,  (Italian: Il pluralismo tra liberalismo e socialismo, Bologna: Il Mulino 1976; Croatian: Pluralizam izmedu liberalizma I socijalizma, Zagreb: Informator 1992)
 Sozialistischer Pluralismus in Europa: Ansätze und Scheitern am Beispiel Portugals. Cologne: Wissenschaft u. Politik 1984, .
 Ausgebürgert und doch angebräunt: Deutsche Politikwissenschaft 1920–1945. Baden-Baden: Nomos 1991, .
 Mondsüchtig: Wernher von Braun und die Geburt der Raumfahrt aus dem Geist der Barbarei. Reinbek: Rowohlt 1996 (2nd ed. [pb] 2000; 3rd ed. Springe: zu Klampen 2012; Czech: Touha po mešíci, Brno: Jota 1997, .)
 (with Michael Th. Greven and Hans Karl Rupp): Political Science and Regime Change in 20th Century Germany. New York: Nova Science Publishers 1996
 Als Teenager träumten: Die magischen 50er Jahre. Baden-Baden: Nomos 1999, .
 Streitbare Politikwissenschaft: Studien zu Demokratisierung, politischer Kultur und wissenschaftlicher Verantwortung. Baden-Baden: Nomos 2006, .
 (ed.): Pluralism. Developments in the Theory and Practice of Democracy. Opladen, Farmington Hills: Barbara Budrich 2006, .
 (co-ed. with Leslie A. Pal): Political Science in Central-East Europe: Diversity and Convergence. Opladen, Farmington Hills: Barbara Budrich 2010, .
 Radical Approaches to Political Science: Roads Less Traveled. Opladen, Berlin, Toronto: Barbara Budrich 2012, .
 Mitgemacht. Theodor Eschenburgs Beteiligung an "Arisierungen" im Nationalsozialismus. Wiesbaden: Springer VS 2015, .
 Political Science: Reflecting on Concepts, Demystifying Legends. Opladen, Berlin, Toronto: Barbara Budrich 2016, .
 Empowering Citizens, Engaging the Public: Political Science for the 21st Century. London: Palgrave Macmillan 2019, .
 Die bewaffnete Gesellschaft der USA. Westernmythos und Schusswaffenkultur. Wiesbaden: Springer 2021, .
 (co-ed., with Matthew Flinders) Political Science in the Shadow of the State. Research, Relevance, Deference. London: Palgrave Macmillan 2021, .

Major chapters and articles (selection) 
 Portugal and Western Europe, in: Kenneth Maxwell (ed.), Portugal in the 1980s:      Dilemmas of Democratic Consolidation, New York/Westport: Greenwood Press, 1986, 29–62. 
 Myths and Realities of Frontier Violence: A Look at the Gunfighter Saga, Journal of Criminal Justice and Popular Culture, Vol. 3 (1995), 106–122 [repr. in: Sean E. Anderson/Gregory J. Howard (eds.), Interrogating Popular Culture: Deviance, Justice, and Social Order, Albany: Harrow & Heston, 1998, 42–54. ]
 'Fortschritt' durch Vernichtung: Raketenpioniere und KZ-Häftlinge im NS-Staat, Postscript to: Yves Béon: Planet Dora. Als Gefangener im Schatten der V 2-Ra¬kete, Gerlingen: Bleicher, 1999, 277–298. 
 How Political Science Might Regain Relevance and Obtain an Audience: A Manifesto for the 21st Century, European Political Science, Vol. 10 (2011), 220-225.
 Political Science in Great Britain and Germany. The Roles of LSE (the London School of Economics) and DHfP (the German Political Studies Institute), Polish Political Science Review (Polski Przeglad Politologiczny), Vol. 2 (2014), No. 2, 71-82 |url=http://politologia.uni.wroc.pl/politicalreview/images/5_Eisfeld.pdf.

References

External links
 
 Personal homepage (University of Osnabrück)
 Conference on 'Imagining Outer Space, 1900-2000', Bielefeld University, 2008
 Eisfeld, R. (2011). Pluralism. In B. Badie, D. Berg-Schlosser, & L. Morlino (Eds.), International encyclopedia of political science. (pp. 1868-1873). Thousand Oaks, CA: SAGE Publications, Inc. doi: 10.4135/9781412959636.n433 

1941 births
Writers from Osnabrück
German political scientists
Writers from Berlin
German non-fiction writers
Living people
German male non-fiction writers